Guyana competed at the 2014 Summer Youth Olympics, in Nanjing, China from 16 August to 28 August 2014.

Athletics

Guyana qualified one athlete.

Qualification Legend: Q=Final A (medal); qB=Final B (non-medal); qC=Final C (non-medal); qD=Final D (non-medal); qE=Final E (non-medal)

Boys
Track & road events

Swimming

Guyana qualified two swimmers.

Boys

Girls

Table Tennis

Guyana was given a quota to compete by the tripartite committee.

Singles

Team

Qualification Legend: Q=Main Bracket (medal); qB=Consolation Bracket (non-medal)

References

2014 in Guyanese sport
Nations at the 2014 Summer Youth Olympics
Guyana at the Youth Olympics